The 19th Biathlon European Championships were held in Osrblie, Slovakia from January 25 to February 2, 2012.

There were total of 15 competitions held: sprint, pursuit and individual both for U26 and U21, relay races for U26 and a mixed relay for U21.

Schedule of events 

The schedule of the event stands below. All times in CET.

Results

U26

Men's

Women's

U21

Men's

Women's

Mixed

Medal table

External links 
 Results
 IBU full results
 Snowy Osrblie Preparing for IBU OECH
 IBU Open European Championships Opens in Osrblie
 Christiansen Wins Junior Men’s Sprint
 Gold for Bulgaria
 Pidhrushna Wins Women’s Sprint
 Russians Victorious in Men’s Pursuits
 Anti-Doping Seminar at IBU OECH
 Gold for Zagoruiko
 German Day at OECH
 Gold for Norway’s Huber in Osrblie
 Russia’s Loginov Tops Norwegian Duo
 Germany and Ukraine Win Relays

 
Biathlon European Championships
Biathlon competitions in Slovakia
2012 in biathlon
2012 in Slovak sport